Jazz in the Garden is the debut release from the Stanley Clarke Trio, featuring pianist Hiromi and drummer Lenny White. It was released in 2009 on CD and vinyl. The album consists mainly of cover songs, but also includes new compositions by both Clarke and Hiromi, and one improv piece.

Track listing

 "Paradigm Shift (Election Day 2008)" (Clarke) (7:42)
 "Sakura Sakura" (Traditional) (5:30)
 "Sicilian Blue" (Hiromi Uehara) (4:48)
 "Take the Coltrane" (Duke Ellington) (3:29)
 "3 Wrong Notes" (Clarke) (5:46)
 "Someday My Prince Will Come" (Frank Churchill, Larry Morey) (4:52)
 "Isotope" (Joe Henderson) (5:27)
 "Bass Folk Song No. 5 & 6" (Clarke) (4:01)
 "Global Tweak" (Clarke, Hiromi Uehara) (3:42)
 "Solar" (Miles Davis) (5:12)
 "Brain Training" (Hiromi Uehara) (4:52)
 "Under the Bridge" (Michael Balzary, Anthony Kiedis, Chad Smith, John Frusciante) (5:30)

Personnel 
Stanley Clarke Trio
 Stanley Clarke - double bass
 Hiromi Uehara - piano
 Lenny White - drums

References 

2009 albums
Stanley Clarke albums
Heads Up International albums
Albums produced by Stanley Clarke